Paolo Carlini (6 January 1922 – 3 November 1979) was an Italian stage, television and film actor. He appeared in 45 films between 1940 and 1979. He is perhaps best-known to international audiences for his supporting role as the hairdresser Mario in Roman Holiday (1953) alongside Audrey Hepburn and Gregory Peck.

Born in  Sant'Arcangelo di Romagna, Carlini  followed the acting courses held by actress Teresa Franchini and debuted at very young age on stage. He is regarded as one of the early stars of Italian television mini-series (the so-called "sceneggiati"). He is also well known for his association with actress Lea Padovani, with whom he starred in a number of critically acclaimed stage dramas in the 1950s. Aside from his long film career, Carlini attained notoriety as the rumoured partner of Giovanni Cardinal Montini, Archbishop of Milan, latterly Pope Paul VI.

Partial filmography

 Goodbye Youth (1940) - Pino
 Ridi pagliaccio (1941) - Uno spettatore nel circo
 La grande strada (1947) - Adam
 L'apocalisse (1947)
 Baron Carlo Mazza (1948) - Fugi
 Napoli eterna canzone (1949) - Roberto Mari
 I due derelitti (1951)
 Papà ti ricordo (1952) - Andrea
 La storia del fornaretto di Venezia (1952)
 The Mute of Portici (1952) - 'Masaniello'
 Roman Holiday (1953) - Mario Delani
 Cardinal Lambertini (1954) - Lawyer Carlo Barozzi
 Mai ti scorderò (1956) - Riccardo Selvi
 La voce che uccide (1956) - Giornalista
 La Gioconda (1958) - Enzo Grimaldo, principe di Santa Flora
 It Started in Naples (1960) - Renzo
 Luciano, una vita bruciata (1962) - Paolo
 Divorzio alla siciliana (1963) - Alfio
 The Betrothed (1964) - Egidio
 Love Italian Style (1965) - Il principe Braccioforte
 Gli altri, gli altri... e noi (1967)
 The Chronicle of Anna Magdalena Bach (1968) - Hölzel
 Psychopath (1968) - Inspektor Harold Bennett
 Quarta parete (1968) - Don Luigi
 Either All or None (1968) - Buseba
 Don Chisciotte and Sancio Panza (1968) - Don José
 I 2 deputati (1968) - Paolo Silvestri
 Puro siccome un Angelo papà mi fece monaco... di Monza (1969)
 Un caso di coscienza (1970) - Don Gualtiero
 Le inibizioni del dottor Gaudenzi, vedovo, col complesso della buonanima (1971) - Prof. Viscardi
 Don Camillo e i giovani d'oggi (1972) - Don Chichí
 Fratello ladro (1942)
 My Darling Slave (1973) - Manlio
 Monika (1974)  - Avv. Massimo Moroni
 Il domestico (1974) - Andrea Donati
 Blue Jeans (1975) - Dr. Carlo Anselmi
 Like Rabid Dogs (1976) - Enrico Ardenghi
 Diary of a Passion (1976) - Pierino
 Lo scoiattolo (1979)

References

External links

1922 births
1979 deaths
People from Santarcangelo di Romagna
Italian male film actors
20th-century Italian male actors
Italian male stage actors
Italian male television actors